This is a list of the most populous municipalities in the Nordic countries, with only municipalities of at least 100,000 inhabitants. Of the five Nordic countries (Denmark, Finland, Iceland, Norway, and Sweden), every country has at least one city above 100,000 inhabitants.

List

See also
List of larger urban zones in the Nordic countries
List of urban areas in the Nordic countries
Largest metropolitan areas in the Nordic countries
List of metropolitan areas in Sweden

References

1  The statistics only include matriculated areas covered by the survey, thus most lakes and all seawater is excluded.

Nordic countries
Nordic